Thomas Shelby may refer to:

 Thomas Shelby, musician in the American band Lakeside
 Tom Shelby (fl. 1853, founder of Shelby, Mississippi, U.S.
 Tommie Shelby (born 1967), American philosopher
 Tommy Shelby, a fictional character from Peaky Blinders

See also
Thomas Shelby House, a historic home near Lexington, in Lafayette County, Missouri, U.S.